Noc Walpurgi is a 2015 Polish horror drama film set on Walpurgis Night.

Production
The film is based on a stage play and was produced in black and white.

Plot
In Switzerland in 1969 a young French journalist visits an opera singer, walking into her changing room. He claims that he is only there to interview her, but his questions pull the diva towards painful memories and confessions of the Holocaust.

Reception

Łukasz Maciejewski and Dagmara Romanowska of Onet gave it positive reviews. Krzysztof Połaski of Telemagazyn and Bartosz Staszczyszyn of Culture.pl did as well.

See also
 Holiday horror

References

External links
 

Holiday horror films
Films about the aftermath of the Holocaust
Polish black-and-white films
2015 films
Polish horror films
Walpurgis Night fiction